Optași-Măgura is a commune in Olt County, Muntenia, Romania. It is composed of a single village, Optași. It also included Vitănești village until 2004, when it was split off to form Sârbii-Măgura Commune.

Natives
 Ion Predescu

References

Communes in Olt County
Localities in Muntenia